The Sacred Service for the Sabbath Morning is a piece of religious music written by Darius Milhaud on a 1948 commission from the Congregation Emanu-El Synagogue in San Francisco.
It is a composition for baritone soloist, narrator (speaking), choir, and orchestra.  The choral text is in Hebrew, that of the narrator in Hebrew and English.

It is one of the two musical compositions that include the Hebrew liturgy of an entire prayer service, the other being Ernest Bloch's Avodath Hakodesh, a work commissioned by the same synagogue.

The composer, himself of Jewish origin and having composed other Jewish-inspired works, used the Provençal Rite as the foundation of the work.  Saturday 
morning prayer not being universal, secondary parts were added for Friday evening prayers, making for easier use.

The premiere took place on May 18, 1949 with the University of California, Berkeley Chorus and San Francisco Symphony under Milhaud's direction.

The work is made up of four parts, a performance taking a little less than an hour.
Part I
Ma tovu
Bar'khu
Sh'ma
V'ahavta
Mi khamokha
Tzur yisrael
Eternal is thy power (Narrator)
K'dusha
Part II
Prayer and response
Silent Prayer
Yihyu l'ratzon
Part III : Torah
S'u sh'arim
Taking the scroll from the ark
Returning the scroll to the ark
The law of the Lord is perfect (Narrator)
Etz Hayyim
Part IV
Adoration
Va'anahnu
Universal Prayer
Mourners kaddish (Narrator)
Mourners kaddish (Choir)
Adon Olam
Benediction
Additional Prayers
L'kha dodi
Mi Khamokha
V'sham'ru
Eloheinu velohei avoteinu r'tze
Yism'hu

References
Matthews, Robert Harold. "Darius Milhaud's Sacred Service a Historical, Textual, and Theoretical Analysis." Dissertation. The University of North Carolina at Greensboro, 2011. NC Docks. Web. <https://libres.uncg.edu/ir/uncg/f/Matthews_uncg_0154D_10828.pdf>.

Levin, Neil W. "Milken Archive of Jewish Music – Works – Sérvice Sacré." Milken Archive of Jewish Music – Works – Sérvice Sacré. Milken Archive of Jewish Music. Web. <http://www.milkenarchive.org/works/view/375>.

Compositions by Darius Milhaud
Jewish music